Mr C B (Japanese : ミスターシービー, April 7, 1980 - December 15, 2000) was a Japanese Thoroughbred racehorse.  He won the Japanese Triple Crown in 1983. He died of old age in 2000.

Background
Mr C B was a bay horse bred in Japan by Chigira Bokujo. He was sired by Tosho Boy, a son of Tesco Boy, out of C.B. Queen, a daughter of Topyo.

Racing career 

 Major Racing Wins
 1983 Yayoi Sho, Nakayama Turf 1800m
 1983 Satsuki Sho (Japanese 2000 Guineas), Nakayama Turf 2000m
 1983 Tokyo Yushun (Japanese Derby), Tokyo Turf 2400m
 1983 Kikuka Sho (Japanese St. Leger), Kyoto Turf 3000m
 1984 Tenno Sho (autumn) (Domestic GI), Tokyo Turf 2000m

Awards
Mr C B was named Japanese Horse of the Year for 1983 and was later inducted into the Japan Racing Association Hall of Fame in 1986.

Pedigree

See also 

 St Lite (Japanese first Triple crown in 1941)
 Shinzan (Japanese Triple crown in 1964)
 Symboli Rudolf (Japanese first undefeated Triple crown in 1984)
 Narita Brian (Japanese Triple crown in 1994)
 Deep Impact (Japanese Triple crown in 2005)
 Orfevre (Japanese Triple crown in 2011)
 Contrail (Japanese Triple crown in 2020)

References

1980 racehorse births
2000 racehorse deaths
Racehorses bred in Japan
Racehorses trained in Japan
Triple Crown of Thoroughbred Racing winners
Japanese Thoroughbred Horse of the Year
Thoroughbred family 9-h